Every year, the east forum Berlin brings together opinion leaders from the political and business worlds in the East and the West to discuss challenges and opportunities faced by the economic area from Lisbon to Vladivostok and beyond. It was founded in 2013.
 
The overall aim of the east forum Berlin is to facilitate dialogue in order to overcome barriers for prosperity, to exchange know-how and intensify networks. In addition, this international event is an opportunity to present Berlin as a vibrant location of political and economic debate.

east forum Berlin 2015 
The third east forum Berlin was devoted to the opportunities and challenges for a common economic space from Lisbon to Vladivostok. The central issues of the forum were economic reforms aimed at external stabilization and a progress assessment.

east forum Berlin 2016 
It the 4th forum that took place during Germany's OSCE Chairmanship in the middle of new deadlocks and new dynamics that characterise the transforming economic and political realities between Europe and the East. Generally, the event focused on Europe’s economic future. One of the main topics was the trade relations between the European Union and the Eurasian Economic Union, and China’s Silk Road Initiative.

The two opposing trends are embedded in new division lines leading to an unfamiliar status quo of alienation. Secondly, they are surrounded by recently formed alliances consisting of as yet poorly known stakeholders, which create new spheres of influence. These dynamics offer potential for growth but also involve geopolitical and geo-economic challenges for all stakeholders in the region.

east forum Berlin 2017 
The title of the forum was: "The future of European and Eurasian partnership: Rebuilding trust. Defining drivers. Overcoming barriers".

List of speakers since 2013

Organization 
The east forum Berlin has been founded by Achim Oelgarth, Rainer Lindner as well as Ivonne Bollow and is organized by UniCredit, Metro Group, and the Committee on Eastern European Economic Relations (Ost-Ausschuss der Deutschen Wirtschaft) in cooperation with the Federal State of Berlin. Since 2016  and DIHK have joined as well. Media partners are eastonline and Ost-Ausschuss Informationen. Participation is by invitations only, which are extended to representatives from politics and business.

See also
Economic Council Germany

References

External links 
 

Business conferences
Events in Berlin